This is a list of electoral results for the Division of Cook in Australian federal elections from the electorate's creation in 1969 until the present.

Members

Election results

Elections in the 2020s

2022

Elections in the 2010s

2019

2016

2013

2010

Elections in the 2000s

2007

2004

2001

Elections in the 1990s

1998

1996

1993

1990

Elections in the 1980s

1987

1984

1983

1980

Elections in the 1970s

1977

1975

1974

1972

Elections in the 1960s

1969

References

 Australian Electoral Commission. Federal election results
 Carr, Adam. Psephos

Australian federal electoral results by division